The women's 60 metres at the 2018 IAAF World Indoor Championships took place on 2 March 2018.

Summary
Carolle Zahi led the opening heats with her personal best of 7.11.  Murielle Ahouré showed her cards in the semi-final round, her 7.01 .06 faster than the top sprinter in the world the last couple of seasons, Elaine Thompson.  7.01 would have been fast enough to win the final.

In the final, Ahouré blasted out of the blocks.  With short quick, strides she had opened up a metre lead over Zahi, 20 metres into the race.  The rest of the contenders formed a line across the track, only Remona Burchell was beaten at this point.  The first to run down Zahi was returning silver medalist Dafne Schippers as Zahi faded.  Schippers also faded, the battle in the center of the track was between Mujinga Kambundji and Marie-Josée Ta Lou, with Thompson inches behind.  With her pursuers in full flight, Ahouré's lead shrunk slightly, but was insurmountable.  Ta Lou and Kambundji crossed the line together, Ta Lou getting the silver by .005 over Kambundji.

It was the first gold medal for the Ivory Coast, made more remarkable by the fact that it was a one-two sweep for the nation.

Results

Heats
The heats were started at 10:35.

Semifinal
The semifinals were started at 18:50.

Final

The final was started at 21:42.

Irish Flag 
When Murielle Ahouré celebrated winning the final, she borrowed an Irish flag from a spectator and reversed it due to the two flag's similarity.

References

60 metres
60 metres at the World Athletics Indoor Championships
2018 in women's athletics